Blakeley is a ghost town in Baldwin County, Alabama, United States.  During the height of its existence, Blakeley was a thriving town which flourished as a competitor to its western neighbor, Mobile. Blakeley was the county seat for Baldwin County from 1820 until 1868, when the county government was moved south to Daphne.
It was the location of a major fort during the Civil War. One of the last battles of the Civil War was fought here in April 1865, as Union soldiers overran Confederates.  The town is now in an Alabama historic state park known as Historic Blakeley State Park, north of Spanish Fort.

Before the town was established and populated by European settlers, Native Americans had lived in the area. A burial mound was found near the site of the town and was excavated. Four skulls, various bones and copper ornaments were found.

In 1813, Blakeley was founded by Josiah Blakeley, "an entrepreneur and adventurer from Connecticut" who moved to Mobile in 1806.
He purchased  of land in the northeastern portion of Mobile Bay. In 1813 he hired a surveyor to lay out the town of Blakeley and sold the first 10 lots. On January 6, 1814, the Mississippi Territorial Legislature authorized Josiah Blakeley to lay out a town to be known as Blakeley. It received official incorporation from the State of Alabama in 1820.

After the War of 1812, Jacob Bell and David Brown became successful shipbuilders in Blakeley. They left for New York City in 1820 to found Brown & Bell, a shipyard famous for its clipper ships and steamships.

Blakeley had a "deep natural port, which was reachable by ships that could not cross the Dog River bar, a sandbar that sometimes impeded shipping access to Mobile." For some years, Blakeley competed with Mobile to be the top port in what was then the Alabama Territory.

A post office operated under the name "Blakeley" from 1826 to 1866.

In 1974, the ghost town was listed on the National Register of Historic Places.

Notable people
 Lavinia Stoddard (1787–1820), poet, school founder

References

Sources:
 Hamilton, Peter. Colonial Mobile. 1910. Reprint, Tuscaloosa, Ala.: University of Alabama Press, 1976.
 Harris, W. Stuart. Dead Towns of Alabama. Tuscaloosa, Ala.: University of Alabama Press, 1977.
 Nuzum, Kay. A History of Baldwin County. Fairhope, Ala.: Page & Palette, 1971.

See also
 Baldwin County, Alabama
 Battle of Fort Blakely

External links

AmericanCivilWar.com. "Blakeley State Park". Accessed April 20, 2007.
Historic Blakeley State Park. " The Town of Blakeley". Accessed April 20, 2007.
 Alabama's First Ferry Located at Blakeley, Alabama
 Blakeley's Fall Laid To Greed Speculators
Gatra Wehle Nature Center
, "an unpublished novella written by Marshall Wallace about the Stoddard family, early residents of Blakeley"

National Register of Historic Places in Baldwin County, Alabama
Populated places established in 1814
Ghost towns in Alabama
Protected areas of Baldwin County, Alabama
National Register of Historic Places in Alabama
1814 establishments in the United States
Former county seats in Alabama
Populated places on the National Register of Historic Places in Alabama
Ghost towns in the United States
Ghost towns in North America